The 2018 Copa Chile (officially known as Copa Chile MTS 2018 due to its sponsorship), was the 39th edition of the Copa Chile, the country's national football cup tournament. Santiago Wanderers were the defending champions, but lost to Palestino in the second round of the competition. Palestino went on to become champions after defeating Audax Italiano in the final by an aggregate score of 4–2.

Format 
The 2018 Copa Chile is based on a system of direct elimination with double-legged ties, similar to the Copa del Rey. As a novelty, after 6 years, clubs that are members of the Segunda División Profesional were included, and after 8 years, clubs of the ANFA were also included, such as these of Tercera División A and Tercera División B.

Prizes 
The champions of this edition (or the runners-up, if the champions had already qualified) earned the right to compete in the 2019 Copa Libertadores, taking the Chile 4 berth. Besides, they also earned the right to play the 2019 Supercopa de Chile. Unlike previous Copa Chile editions, the runners-up were not entitled to a berth to the Copa Sudamericana.

Schedule

Teams 
48 clubs took part in this edition of the Copa Chile: 16 from the Primera División, 16 from the Primera B, 10 from the Segunda División Profesional and 6 from the Tercera División A.

Primera A

 Audax Italiano
 Colo-Colo
 Curicó Unido
 Deportes Antofagasta
 Deportes Iquique
 Deportes Temuco
 Everton
 Huachipato
 O'Higgins
 Palestino
 San Luis
 Unión Española
 Unión La Calera
 Universidad Católica
 Universidad de Chile
 Universidad de Concepción

Primera B

 Barnechea
 Cobreloa
 Cobresal
 Coquimbo Unido
 Deportes Copiapó
 Deportes La Serena
 Deportes Melipilla
 Deportes Puerto Montt
 Deportes Valdivia
 Magallanes
 Ñublense
 Rangers
 San Marcos de Arica 
 Santiago Morning
 Santiago Wanderers
 Unión San Felipe

Segunda División

 Colchagua
 Deportes Recoleta
 Deportes Santa Cruz
 Deportes Vallenar
 Fernández Vial
 General Velásquez
 Iberia
 Independiente (Cauquenes)
 Malleco Unido
 San Antonio Unido

Tercera A

 Deportes Limache
 Deportes Linares
 Lautaro de Buin
 Municipal Santiago
 Provincial Ovalle
 Tomás Greig

Preliminary phases

First round
The pairings for the first round were announced by the ANFP on 16 April 2018. The 16 teams from the Segunda División and Tercera División A were drawn against the 16 Primera B teams, according to geographical and safety criteria. The first legs were played on 25, 28–30 April, 2 and 6 May and the second legs were played on 2–3, 5–6 and 16 May 2018.

|}

First leg

Second leg

Second round
In the second round, the 16 winning teams from the previous round were drawn against the 16 Primera División teams which entered the competition at this stage. As in the previous round, the pairings were based on geographical and safety criteria. In each tie, the team from the lower tier hosted the first leg. The pairings for the second round were announced by the ANFP on 18 May 2018, the first legs were played from 9 to 17 June 2018 and the second legs were played from 14 to 21 July 2018.

|}

First leg

Second leg

Bracket

Final phases

Round of 16 
The draw for the Round of 16 and subsequent phases was held on 28 May 2018. Starting from this round, the order of legs in each tie will depend on the number assigned to the second round tie won by each team, with the team with the highest number in each tie hosting the second leg. The first legs were played from 22 to 24 June 2018 and the second legs were played from 29 June to 2 July 2018.

|}

First leg

Second leg

Quarterfinals 
The first legs were played on 7 and 8 July 2018, while the second legs were played on 13 and 14 July 2018.

|}

First leg

Second leg

Semifinals 

The first legs were played on 8 September 2018, and the second legs were played on 12 and 13 October 2018.

|}

First leg

Second leg

Finals 
For the first time since 2011, the finals were played in a two-legged tie format.

Palestino won 4–2 on aggregate.

Top goal scorers

Source: ANFP

References 

Chile
2018
Copa Chile